Jazeh Tabatabai (January 17, 1931 – February 9, 2008) was an Iranian avant-garde painter, poet, and sculptor.

Tabatabai received over 10 major international awards for his paintings and sculptures. He was the founder and director of the Iran Modern Art Gallery in Tehran, Iran.

Tabatabai's present fame is mostly due to his creative figures and metal sculptures which he assembled with parts from old machinery and cars. His style is close to the Saqqā-ḵāna School of Art; lion-women and suns are repeating themes in his work. For this reason, he is cited alongside a handful of other influential Iranian artists as a pioneer of the Saqqā-ḵāna School of Art, which took form in the 80s.

Biography

Tabatabai was born on January 17, 1931. He wrote his first story, titled "Sand and Straw", at the age of 12 and subsequently entered other artistic fields. He went on to write and direct such plays as "Withering Blossoms", "Lord Chichi Yanf", "Footstep", and "Mister Muchul", and produced another of his own plays called "Scout Association". In 1947 he published "The Little Boy", a story.

In 1951 Tabatabai earned a diploma from the School of Arts and displayed his art, which was then miniatures at his first art exhibition. Four years later he achieved the position of top student in the Film Direction and Principles of Theatre program at the Iranian College of Literature and produced the play "Sailor's Shirt".

In 1961, he completed his painting courses at the College of Fine Arts and established the Modern Iran Art Gallery, the first art gallery in Iran.

Works

Tabatabai's works can be found in major collections and in many museums around the globe including the Louvre and the Metropolitan Museum of Art. Additionally, his works have been displayed in exhibitions in England, India, Italy, Germany, Spain, Greece, Australia, France and the United States.

The Artists' House Khaneh-ye Honarmandan in Tehran held an exhibition of Tabatabai's sculptures at the turn of 2018 and 2019.

Works about Tabatabai

In 1967 Khosrow Sinai directed a film about Tabatabai's work called "Biography". In 1997 ga made another film on the artist's life called "Autumn Road".

Later life

In his later years Tabatabai lived in Spain, spending some time each year in Iran. He died on February 9, 2008, at Tehran's Atieh Hospital at 7 pm, three weeks after his 77th birthday.

References and footnotes

1931 births
2008 deaths
Iranian sculptors
20th-century Iranian poets
20th-century sculptors
20th-century Iranian painters